Jan Wames, Latinized Johannes Wamesius (1524—1590) was a professor of canon law at the University of Leuven.

Life
Wamesius studied law and ancient languages at Leuven, graduating Doctor of both laws on 29 August 1553. In 1555 he was appointed a professor in the Faculty of Law, and in 1570 first professor of canon law. He wrote legal opinions on the application of both canon and civil law that were highly valued by the governor-general, John of Austria. He was offered a place on the governor-general's council but turned down the appointment in order to keep teaching. His writings were only published posthumously.

One case on which he advised on the application of the law of negligence was that of Willem van Aarschot, who while walking near an archery range was blinded in one eye by an arrow shot by Willem van den Putte.

Writings
Recitationes ad tit. XXVIII lib. II Decret. de Appellationibus (Leuven, Gerard Rivius, 1599); dedicated to Heinrich von Ruisschenberch, commander of the Teutonic Order
Responsorum sive Consiliorum de Jure pontificio (2 vols., Leuven, Gerard Rivius, 1605); dedicated to Ferdinand of Bavaria
 (3 vols., Leuven, Hendrik Hastens, 1625); dedicated to the States of Brabant

References

External links

Responsorum sive Consiliorum de Jure pontificio (1605 edition) on Google Books
Responsorum sive Consiliorum ad Jus forumque civile pertinentium centuriae (1625 edition) on Google Books

1524 births
1590 deaths
Writers from Liège
16th-century Latin-language writers
Academic staff of the Old University of Leuven
Belgian legal scholars